The Grand Ried is an Alsatian natural region which is part of the Ried. It shows landscapes typical of the Ried. To the west, it is delimited by the Ill, and by the Rhine to the east. It stretches between Strasbourg and Colmar. It was formed by the meandering Rhine (and Ill), before it was canalised. The Rhine used to spread its sediments when inundations occurred. Today the Rhine is corseted between embankments.

The Erstein polder is used to regulate the flow of the Rhine, thus avoiding inundations.
It has been listed as a national nature reserve since 1989. As a matter of fact, it is still
possible to discover in the reserve the biodiversity which used to exist when the  Grand Ried
was wild and the Rhine was not canalised.

The commune of Rhinau presents a unique feature: it possesses an area of almost 1000 ha
directly at the border, however on German soil. This is Rheinau. 
The landscape is characterised by numerous Baggersee (German word used in Alsace and meaning lakes
forming once sand and gravel pits have been shut down) and sand pits which are still being operated.

Nature reserves 
There are national nature reserves:
 Île de Rhinau
 Île du Rohrschollen
 Massif forestier de Strasbourg-Neuhof/Illkirch-Graffenstaden

as well as a regional nature reserve:
 Forêt de l'Illwald (next to Sélestat)

Let us mention that there is a nature reserve in Rheinau:
 Taubergießen
on German soil.

Renewable energy 
In Marckolsheim, Rhinau, Gerstheim as well as Strasbourg hydro-electricity is produced by
France.

See also 
 Petit Ried

External links 
 Tourism Office of the Grand Ried

References 

Geography of Grand Est
France–Germany border